Ciucă is a Romanian surname. Notable people with the surname include:

 Eugen Ciucă (1913–2005), Romanian-American artist
 Mihai Ciucă (1883–1969), Romanian bacteriologist and parasitologist
 Nicolae Ciucă (born 1967), Romanian general and politician

Romanian-language surnames